Oliver Dupont (born 16 January 1990) is a Danish curler. He won a gold medal at the 2009 World Junior Curling Championships.

Career

Juniors
As a junior curler, Dupont competed in five consecutive World Junior Curling Championships with Denmark from 2006 to 2010. Denmark's best result was in 2009, when they won their first ever junior title. Dupont's all-time World Junior Curling Championship personal record is 22–19.

Mixed doubles and men's
Dupont jumped into mixed curling, competing in the 2012 World Mixed Doubles Curling Championship with Mette de Neergard. They finished in 9th. He later curled at the 2015 World Mixed Doubles Curling Championship with his sister, Denise. They placed 5th.

Dupont is a two-time Danish mixed doubles curling champion curler (in 2012 with Mette de Neergaard, in 2015 with Denise Dupont).

At the 2014 European Curling Championships, Dupont and his team finished in ninth. However, Denmark had already qualified for the 2014 World Men's Championships the year before, and the Hvidore CC traveled to Beijing to compete. Dupont was an alternate, but ended up playing. Denmark finished in 12th.

Dupont has also competes at various World Curling Tour events, most recently the 2013 German Masters and 2014 Baden Masters.

Personal life
Oliver comes from a curling family. Dupont's father, Kim, competed at the 1980 and 1981 World Junior Curling Championships. They both curled for Hvidore CC. His sister, Denise, has competed at the 2006 and 2010 Olympics, as well as nine World Championships. His other sister, Madeleine, competed at the 2010 Olympics, and won the Frances Brodie Award in 2004.

He is engaged to Russian curler Viktoria Moiseeva.

References

External links
 

Living people
1990 births
Danish male curlers
Sportspeople from Frederiksberg
Continental Cup of Curling participants
Curlers at the 2018 Winter Olympics
Olympic curlers of Denmark
21st-century Danish people